The London Millennium Tower was one of several ideas for the site of the former Baltic Exchange at 30 St Mary Axe, City of London that had been destroyed beyond repair by a Provisional IRA bomb blast. 

Designed by Foster & Partners, for then owner Trafalgar House, the plan was for the building to be the tallest in Europe and the sixth tallest in the world at that time, behind the twin Petronas Towers in Malaysia, the Sears Tower (now called the Willis Tower) in Chicago, and the twin towers of the World Trade Center in New York. Its height was planned at 386 metres (1,265 ft), with 92 floors, which means it would have been 39th in the world today, and would be overtaken in Europe by the Federation Tower. A public viewing platform was planned for 1000 ft above ground level.

The scheme featured a highly unorthodox floor layout, essentially two asymmetrical ellipses joined at one end. When the plans were first unveiled in 1996, the Guardian newspaper coined the term "erotic gherkin", a name that was quickly taken up by other media and which stuck even after the plan was superseded, eventually becoming 30 St Mary Axe, the name of a different skyscraper that stands on the site today.

English Heritage had been one of the largest backers of the project until they withdrew their support, due to Heathrow Airport objecting to the disruption that such a tall building would have on their flight paths. The project was eventually cancelled and the site sold to Swiss Re, which created its headquarters, also designed by Foster & Partners.

References

External links
Emporis entry for the Millennium Tower

Buildings and structures in the City of London
Unbuilt buildings and structures in the United Kingdom
Foster and Partners buildings